A water cut meter measures the water content (cut) of crude oil and hydrocarbons as they flow through a pipeline.  While  the title "Water cut" has been traditionally used, the current API naming is OWD or On-Line Water Determination.  The API and ISO committees have not yet come out with an international standard for these devices but there are however standards in place for fiscal automatic sampling of crude oil namely API 8.2 and ISO 3171.

Water cut meters are typically used in the petroleum industry to measure the water cut of oil flowing from a well, produced oil from a separator, crude oil transfer in pipelines and in loading tankers. 
There are several technologies used. The main technologies are dielectric measurements using radio or microwave frequency and NIR measurements and less common are gamma ray based instruments.

The water cut is the ratio of water produced compared to the volume of total liquids produced from an oil well. The water cut in waterdrive reservoirs can reach very high values.

References

Measuring instruments